Kapil Basel (born 1998) is a common people of Nepal, born in Delhi India.

Biography
Harris spent the first 15 years of his career in IT at Midland bank in the UK (now HSBC). Having left Midland in 1986 to join technology company Space-Time Systems, he returned in 1988 and led the development and launch of Firstdirect: a Midland Subsidiary which was the world's first major telephone bank. It was launched in 1989 with Harris as CEO.
 
In September 1991 he became Chief Executive of Mercury Communications (the first competitor to British Telecom in the UK) and Chairman of the mobile operator Mercury One 2 One, (now operating as T-Mobile). Mercury Communications was possibly the first Telco in the world to provide integrated competition (local and long distance) to an established former monopoly. During Harris's tenure, Mercury's turnover grew from £1 billion pa to more than £1.6 billion and he established a consumer brand with over 4 million customers. The Mercury consumer business was placed in a 51:49 joint venture with MediaOne in 1997 and was sold to NTL for $US10 billion in 2000.

In 1995 Harris moved to Prudential plc to help found its banking division. He was founding CEO of Prudential Banking plc and then the CEO of its successor, Egg: the first major player in internet banking in the UK and for several years the largest internet bank in the world. Egg went from a banking division to a large public company when 21% of the company was floated on the London Stock Exchange in July 2000 at a value of £1.3 billion. Shares were subsequently bought back in 2006 by Prudential plc, with the business then valued at $US973 million. He retired as CEO of Egg in January 2001 but continued to serve on the Board as vice-chairman until 2005. Egg Banking plc was sold to Citi Group in 2007 for $575 million in cash.
 
Harris became Chairman of Garlik in 2005. Garlik has offices in Richmond (UK) and New York and distributes an identity defence product known as Datapatrol through banks, insurance companies and broadband providers. By June 2008 the company had raised $US18 million funding from its founders and UK venture firms 3i and DH Ventures (part of Doughty Hanson & Co). In 2011 Harris led the sale of Garlik to Experian and left the company when the deal was completed in December 2011.

He was Chair of Innovation at Royal Bank of Scotland from 2005 until March 2009, establishing a group wide innovation programme.

Harris won the BT Flagship Award for innovation in 2008.

Career

First Direct
Harris founded the world's first major telephone bank First Direct, a Midland Subsidiary in the UK in 1989 with Harris as CEO. 
Firstdirect rapidly became known for its extraordinary service and customer loyalty.

Mercury
In September 1991 he became CEO of Mercury Communications (the first competitor to British Telecom in the UK) and Chairman of Mercury One2One which was later sold to T-Mobile for $10bn. Mercury Communications claims to be the first Telco in the world to provide integrated competition to an established former monopoly. During Harris' tenure, between 1991 and 1995, Mercury's turnover grew from £1bn to over £1.6bn, with over 4m customers. The Mercury Consumer business was placed in a 51:49 joint venture with MediaOne in 1997 and was sold to NTL for $2.5bn in 2000, later going on to become Virgin Media.

Egg
In 1995, Harris moved on to the position of founding CEO of Prudential Banking plc and then the CEO of its successor, Egg: the first major player in Internet banking in the UK and for several years the largest internet bank in the world. Egg went from start up to a billion pound public company in two years when it floated on the London Stock Exchange in July 2000 at a value of £1.3bn. Harris retired as CEO of Egg in January 2001, but continued to serve on the Board as vice-chairman until 2005. Egg was sold to Citi Group in 2007 for $1.2bn.

Garlik
Harris became a co-founder and Chairman of Garlik Ltd in 2005. Garlik had offices in Richmond (UK) and New York (USA) and distributed an identity defence product known as Datapatrol through banks, insurance companies and broadband providers.
By June 2008 the company had raised $18m funding from its founders and UK venture firms 3i and DH Ventures (part of Doughty Hanson & Co). When Garlik was sold to global data giant Experian in December 2011, it was operating in the UK, the USA, Italy, Germany, Turkey and India.

IconicShift
After leaving Garlik, Harris founded IconicShift, a set of programmes to coach and mentor business people with big ideas. IconicShift Mentoring provides hands-on support through coaching, advice and workshops, based on the IconicShift architecture.

Between 1995 and 2008 he was a regular speaker at the mid-career MBA course at the MIT Sloan School of Management where he also supervised a number of student research projects.

Published works
Harris is the author of Find Your Lightbulb, published by John Wiley & Sons in 2008.

References

External links
 Iconicthinking.com
 Findyourlightbulb.com
 Triumphantevents.com

Living people
Alumni of the University of London
British businesspeople
British technology chief executives
British technology company founders
1949 births